Kim Nguyen is a Canadian film director and screenwriter, best known for his 2012 film War Witch (Rebelle). The film was the top winner at the 1st Canadian Screen Awards; in addition to being named Best Picture and winning acting awards for two of its stars, Nguyen himself won the awards for Best Director and Best Original Screenplay.

Born and raised in Montreal, Quebec to a Vietnamese father and a French-Canadian mother, Nguyen has directed a number of feature films to date including War Witch  (also known by the French title Rebelle) in 2012 and Eye on Juliet in 2017.

He is a 1997 graduate of Concordia University in Montreal, having earned a BFA.

In 2019 he was the patron and curator of the Festival Vues dans la tête de... film festival in Rivière-du-Loup.

Filmography
Feature films
 The Marsh (Le Marais) - 2002
 Truffe - 2008
 City of Shadows (La Cité) - 2010
 War Witch (Rebelle) - 2012
 Two Lovers and a Bear (Un ours et deux amants) - 2016
 Eye on Juliet - 2017
 The Hummingbird Project - 2018

Others
 Soleil glacé (2000, short)
 The Glove (2004, short)
 La chambre no. 13 (2006, television)
 Le Nez (2014)
 Bellevue (2017, director: 2 episodes)
 American Auto (2022, director: "The $10k Car")

References

External links

Film directors from Montreal
Writers from Montreal
Canadian screenwriters in French
Canadian people of Vietnamese descent
French Quebecers
Living people
Best Director Genie and Canadian Screen Award winners
Best Screenplay Genie and Canadian Screen Award winners
Concordia University alumni
Date of birth missing (living people)
Year of birth missing (living people)
Asian-Canadian filmmakers
Best Director Jutra and Iris Award winners